Dame Julia Mary Goodfellow  (née Lansdall; born 1 July 1951) is a former Vice-Chancellor of the University of Kent, and Chair of the British Science Association. She was the president of Universities UK from 1 August 2015 until July 2017.

Early life, education and career
Goodfellow completed her BSc degree in physics at the University of Bristol  and obtained a PhD degree in biophysics at the Open University Research Unit in Oxford. She began her career as Professor of Biomolecular Science at Birkbeck College in 1995, and was promoted to Vice Master in 1998. In 2002, she was appointed chief executive of the Biotechnology and Biological Sciences Research Council, the first woman to lead a UK research council. Goodfellow served as chair of the British Science Association from 2009 to 2014.

In 2007, she was appointed Vice-Chancellor of the University of Kent. In 2011, she was appointed to both the Council for Science and Technology and the Science and Technology Facilities Council. Currently, Goodfellow is a member of the Higher Education Policy Institute (Hepi) advisory board.

Goodfellow was elected Universities UK president from 2015 to 2017, the first woman to hold the role. In 2015 Goodfellow stated that Universities UK supported staying in the European Union, citing the “economic growth, employable graduates and cutting edge research discoveries” that the EU could provide in the education sector. In 2018 she became president of the Royal Society of Biology.

Honours
2001: Appointed Commander of the Order of the British Empire (CBE)
2002: Honorary Doctor of Science (Hon DSc) degree from the University of Bristol
2002: Honorary Doctor of Science degree from the University of Strathclyde
2004: Doctor of the University (DUniv) degree from the University of Essex
2005: Honorary Doctor of Science degree from the University of Edinburgh
2005: Honorary Doctor of Science degree from Durham University
2009: Honorary Doctor of Science degree from the University of Manchester
2010: Promoted to Dame Commander of the Order of the British Empire (DBE) 'For services to Science'

Personal life
In 1972 Julia Lansdall married Peter Goodfellow, with whom she has one daughter and one son.

Criticism
Goodfellow has been criticised for her travel expenses and pay for the 2014-15 year. Her travel expenses were reported to be £26,635, with 92% of flights being first or business class. She also received a pay rise of 3% in the same year, increasing her salary to £272,000.

She received a £43,000 pay rise in 2012–13, a rise of 19%. Other staff at the university were striking to secure a 2% pay rise in the same year. The university was criticised by the University and College Union for attempting to "obscure key information" by obfuscating records of the meeting in which her salary was decided.

Selected publications

References

|-

1951 births
Academics of Birkbeck, University of London
Alumni of the Open University
Alumni of the University of Bristol
British women scientists
Dames Commander of the Order of the British Empire
English biophysicists
English physicists
Fellows of the Institute of Physics
Living people
Vice-Chancellors of the University of Kent
Place of birth missing (living people)
Women academic administrators
Fellows of the Academy of Medical Sciences (United Kingdom)